Guinea participated in the 2010 Summer Youth Olympics in Singapore.

The Guinean team consisted of 3 athletes competing in 3 sports: athletics, swimming and wrestling.

Athletics

Boys
Track and road events

Swimming

Wrestling

Freestyle

References

External links
Competitors List: Guinea

Nations at the 2010 Summer Youth Olympics
Oly
Guinea at the Youth Olympics